"Dr. Beat" is the first international single released by the American band Miami Sound Machine, led by Cuban-American singer Gloria Estefan, on their first English language, but eighth overall, studio album, Eyes of Innocence (1984). The song which was written by the band's lead songwriter and drummer Enrique "Kiki" Garcia and was released worldwide in 1984 becoming a top success across Europe where the album impacted the charts with this hit.

Song history
"Dr. Beat" was not quite as popular in the US as some of Miami Sound Machine's later singles, only peaking at number 17 on the Billboard Hot Dance Club Play chart. However, it became one of the group's biggest international hits, reaching the top 10 in Spain and peaking at number six in the United Kingdom.

The song has maintained popularity through inclusion on a number of 1980s retrospective albums. It also became popular again in 2005 when Scottish DJ and producer Mylo mashed the song up with his hit "Drop the Pressure" to create "Doctor Pressure", which became a hit single in its own right.

Chart performance
"Dr. Beat" became a sensation in the charts across Europe, becoming the band's first song to enter the charts in a career for more than eight years. The song firstly entered the chart in the UK at the top 10, helped in large part by an appearance on Top of the Pops by the band, and then started to make debut on other European charts. The song was less popular in the United States in comparison to the other countries, only entering the Top 20 at the Dance Club Play charts.

The song was certified Silver by the BPI in the United Kingdom for its sales of 200,000 copies and Gold by the ARIA in Australia for its sales of 35,000 units.

Music video
At the beginning of the music video for the song, which was shot on location on the rooftop of the Bacardi Imports building where Enrique Garcia and Emilio Estefan worked for a short time, Gloria Estefan is singing and dancing on the roof of a tall building, in front of frantic crowd. Estefan is calling for Dr. Beat, which is played by songwriter and drummer Enrique Garcia, to help cure her from her desire to dance continuously. Dr. Beat takes her from the scene to the hospital, as Estefan performs a choreography on the way. In the hospital, Dr. Beat conducts some investigations and performs surgery on Estefan. In the end a boom box is removed from inside of Estefan where it was attached to a cord similar to a umbilical cord on a child and cut by Dr. Beat.

Formats and track listings
These are the formats and track listings of major single releases of "Dr. Beat".

 US 12" Vinyl Maxi-Single (49-05023)
"Dr. Beat" (Long Version)
"Dr. Beat" (Instrumental Version)

 US 7" Vinyl Single (34-04574)
"Dr. Beat" (Album Version)
"When Someone Comes Into Your Life" (Album Version)

Official versions
Original versions
Album Version – 4:26
Long Version – 6:26
Instrumental Version – 5:26
Hustlers Up-Town Full Length Disco Remix – 6:51

Charts

Weekly charts

Year-end charts

Certifications

References

1984 singles
1984 songs
Epic Records singles
Miami Sound Machine songs
Songs written by Enrique Garcia (songwriter)